Joan Carter (born July 2, 1943 in Pittsburgh, Pennsylvania) is an American businessperson and philanthropist. She is President of UM Holdings Ltd. which she co-founded with John Aglialoro. Since 1973, UM Holdings has owned and operated a variety of business, primarily in the health and fitness industries. UM Holdings was the owner of Cybex International and EHE International., both of which were sold in 2016.

Education and achievements
She is a graduate of The College of Wooster, and was awarded the College’s 2005 Distinguished Alumni Award. In 2010, Carter was elected President of The Union League of Philadelphia, the first woman to hold that position in the League’s 150 year history. She was also awarded the Temple University 2011 Musser Award, the Adam Smith Award  in 2012 by Economics Pennsylvania, the IWF Women Who Make a Difference Award in 2018, and 2018 Distinguished Citizen Award from the Valley Forge Freedoms Foundation.

Boards
Carter serves as chairman of the board of the Legacy Foundation formerly the Abraham Lincoln Foundation and FreedomWorks. She currently serves on the board of Philly Pops, The Foundation for Individual Liberty  and as trustee emeritus for the College of Wooster.  Additionally Carter served on the board of Lourdes Health System., the Reason Foundation.  Carter served as director for the Federal Reserve Bank of Philadelphia from 1994 to 2001 and as its chair from 1998 to 2001. She was a director for Carr America  (formerly NYSE: CRE) from 2003 to 2006  when Carr was sold to the Blackstone Group. She was vice chairman of the board of Cybex International from 1997 to 2016  when Cybex was sold to Brunswick Corporation in 2016. She was a director from 2001-2019 for Penn Mutual Life Insurance Company and chair of that board's marketing committee.

Personal life
Carter is married to John Aglialoro, producer of the Atlas Shrugged movie trilogy, on which Carter served as associate producer. She authored The History of the Atlas Shrugged Movie Trilogy  and co-authored Atlas Shrugged: The Novel, the Films, the Philosophy. She has two children, and two step-children, and eight grandchildren.

References

External links
 Profile at UM Holdings
 
  at BizJournals

1943 births
Living people
Businesspeople from Pittsburgh
College of Wooster alumni
American women business executives
American business executives
21st-century American women